Buddhadeb Dasgupta (11 February 1944 – 10 June 2021) was an Indian filmmaker and poet best known for his Bengali-language films like Bagh Bahadur, Tahader Katha, Charachar and Uttara. Five of his films have won the National Film Award for Best Feature Film, Bagh Bahadur (1989), Charachar (1993), Lal Darja (1997), Mondo Meyer Upakhyan (2002) and Kaalpurush (2008), while Dooratwa (1978) and Tahader Katha (1993) have won the National Film Award for Best Feature Film in Bengali. As a director, he has won National Film Award for Best Direction twice, for Uttara (2000) and Swapner Din (2005). Over the years he has published several works of poetry including Govir Araley, Coffin Kimba Suitcase, Himjog, Chhaata Kahini, Roboter Gaan, Sreshtha Kabita, and Bhomboler Ascharya Kahini O Ananya Kabita.

Early life and education
Buddhadeb Dasgupta was born in a Vaidya family in 1944 in Anara near Puruliya in Southern West Bengal, and was the third of nine siblings. His father Tarkanta Dasgupta was a doctor with the Indian Railways, thus he spent the early part of childhood traveling. At the age of twelve, he was sent to Calcutta to study, earlier at Shibpur SSPS Vidyalaya and later at Dinabandhu School, Howrah. Post-independence his father was transferred first to Kharagpur in West Midnapore district and  Manendragarh (now in Chhattisgarh).

He studied economics at the Scottish Church College and the University of Calcutta.

Career 
Buddhadeb started his career as a lecturer of Economics, at the Shyamsundar College of the University of Burdwan followed by City College, Calcutta. In 1976, when disenchanted by the gap he perceived between the economic theory he taught and the socio-political reality, he took to film making. Meanwhile, his membership with the Calcutta Film Society, where he started going in his senior high school along with his uncle, exposed him to the works of directors like Charlie Chaplin, Ingmar Bergman, Akira Kurosawa, Vittorio De Sica, Roberto Rossellini, and Michelangelo Antonioni. This, in turn, inspired him to take film making as a mode of expression. He started his film career with a 10-minute documentary in 1968, The Continent of Love; eventually he made his first full-length feature film, Dooratwa (Distance) in 1978.

His lyricism has been extended to cinema as well. During the early stages of his film career, Dasgupta made films inspired by Satyajit Ray's realistic films and later moved on to other forms. Some of his most acclaimed films are Bagh Bahadur, Tahader Katha, Charachar and Uttara.<ref>Buddhadeb Dasgupta  Upperstall.com.</ref>

 Filmography 

 Feature films Samayer Kache (1968) (short)Dooratwa (1978) (Distance)Neem Annapurna (1979) (Bitter Morsel)Grihajuddha (1982) (The Civil War)Andhi Gali (1984) (Blind Alley, Hindi)Phera (1988) (The Return)Bagh Bahadur (1989) (The Tiger Man)Tahader Katha (1992) (Their Story)Charachar (1993) (Shelter of the Wings)Lal Darja (1997) (The Red Door)Uttara (2000) (The Wrestlers)Mondo Meyer Upakhyan (2002) (A Tale of a Naughty Girl)Swapner Din (2004) (Chased by Dreams)Ami, Yasin Ar Amar Madhubala (2007) (The Voyeurs)Kaalpurush (2008) (Memories in the Mist)Janala (2009) (The Window)Mukti (2012)Choli Ke Pichey (2012) (TV Movie)Arjun (2012) (TV Movie)The Station (2013) (TV Movie)Anwar Ka Ajab Kissa (2013) (Sniffer, Hindi)Tope (2017)Urojahaj (2018) Documentary and TV work The Continent of Love (1968)Dholer Raja Khirode Natta (1973)Fishermen of Sundarban (1974)Saratchandra (1975)Rhythm of Steel (1981)Indian Science Marches Ahead (1984)Vigyan O Tar Avishkar (1980)Story of Glass (1985)India on the Move (1985)Ceramics (1986)Aranyak (1996)Contemporary Indian Sculpture (1987)History of Indian Jute (1990)

Awards

 Buddhadeb Dasgupta was honoured with the lifetime achievement award at the Spain International Film Festival in Madrid on 27 May 2008.
 Golden Athena Award at the Athens International Film Festival in 2007
 National Film Award
 Best Film
 1989: Bagh Bahadur
 1993: Charachar
 1997: Lal Darja
 2002: Mondo Meyer Upakhyan
 2008: Kaalpurush
Best Direction
 2000: Uttara
 2005: Swapner Din
 Best Screenplay
 1987: Phera
Best Feature Film in Bengali
 1978: Dooratwa
 1987: Phera
 1993: Tahader Katha
 Best Arts/Cultural Film
 1998: A Painter of Eloquent Silence: Ganesh Pyne Venice Film Festival
 1982: FIPRESCI award: Grihajuddha
 2000: Silver Lion for Best Director: Uttara
 1982: Golden Lion nomination: Grihajuddha
 2000: Golden Lion nomination: Uttara 
 Berlin International Film Festival
 1988: Golden Bear nomination: Phera
 1994: Golden Bear nomination: Charachar
 Locarno Film Festival
 Critic's Award: Dooratwa
 Special Jury Award: Neem Annapurna
 Asia Pacific Film Festival
 Best Film: Janala
 Karlovy Vary Film Festival
 Special Jury Award: Neem Annapurna
 Damascus International Film Festival
 Golden Prize: Neem Annapurna
 Bangkok International Film Festival
Best Asian Film Award (2003): Mondo Meyer Upakhyan

Family
His youngest daughter, Alokananda Dasgupta, a trained classical pianist, composed the background score for his 2013 film, Anwar Ka Ajab Kissa.

Death
He died at the age of 77 on 10 June 2021.

Further reading
 Buddhadeb Dasgupta: cinema of imprinted times, by Pradip Biswas. Aurora Film Corp., 1999
 Films of Buddhadeb Dasgupta, by John W. Hood. Orient Blackswan, 2005. .
 Sen, Rahul. "Buddhadeb Dasgupta: Transformer of Dreams and Imagination" (in Bengali). Jolghori'' 3. 1-2 (Dec. 2020-Mar. 2021, and Apr.-Jul. 2021): 214-29.

References

External links

Merchant of Dreams: Buddhadeb Dasgupta gets lifetime achievement award at the Spain International Film Festival
Interview-based profile on Write2kill.in

1944 births
2021 deaths
20th-century Indian film directors
Film directors from Kolkata
People from Purulia district
Bengali film producers
Bengali film directors
Film theorists
Indian film score composers
Bengali-language writers
Culture of Kolkata
Scottish Church College alumni
University of Calcutta alumni
Academic staff of the University of Burdwan
Academic staff of the University of Calcutta
Indian documentary filmmakers
Indian male screenwriters
Best Director National Film Award winners
Academic staff of City College, Kolkata
Hindi-language film directors
Bengali male poets
Best Original Screenplay National Film Award winners
Producers who won the Best Feature Film National Film Award
Directors who won the Best Feature Film National Film Award
Venice Best Director Silver Lion winners